The discography for the Japanese band Mr. Children consists of 18 studio albums, 5 compilations albums and 38 singles. They are one of the best selling artists in Japan.

Mr. Children debuted in 1992. The band's initial releases performed poorly on the charts but through word of mouth they gained more popularity. Their 4th single "Cross Road" after 22 weeks sold over a million copies, though released in 1993 and peaked at number five on the Oricon chart. It later managed to become the fifteenth best selling single in Oricon's 1994 yearly charts.
 
The band's first No.1 single on Oricon chart was their 5th single "Innocent World" which was released in June, 1994, becoming the best selling single of 1994  and winning the Japan Record Award (Record of the year) in 1994. The band also released their 6th single "Tomorrow Never Knows" on November 10, 1994. The single solidified the group's popularity with its sales, managing to sell over 2.7 million copies which is the seventh highest-selling single in Japan in Oricon history. and becoming the band's highest selling single to date.

In 1996, they released their 10th single  which became the best selling single of 1996. The single went on to become Japan's highest first week selling single of all time for 15 years, with 1.2 million copies.

On the Oricon album charts their 12th studio album Home became the best-selling album of 2007 in Japan, making it the first time Mr.Children had topped annual album charts in their 16th year since their debut.

In December 2008, they released album Supermarket Fantasy, which became the second best selling album of 2009.

In 2012 they celebrated their 20th debut anniversary by releasing dual best album titled Mr. Children 2001–2005 ＜micro＞ and Mr. Children 2005–2010 ＜macro＞. Both albums dominated the best-selling album category in the 2012 Oricon yearly chart. Mr.Children has become the third artists who achieved TOP two spots on the yearly album ranking, and this is the first time in 14 years for any artist to achieve this. Furthermore ［(An Imitation) Blood Orange］, which is the studio album released in the same year, sold over 530,000 copies in the first week. They had three albums in Top 10 best selling album in 2012.

Studio albums

Compilations

Live albums

Singles

Home video
{| class="wikitable" style="text-align:center"
! Title
! VHS release date
! DVD release date
|-
|align="left"| Es Mr. Children in Film || December 15, 1995 || —
|-
|align="left"| Alive || April 25, 1997 || —
|-
|align="left"| Regress or Progress '96–'97 Document || September 10, 1997 || —
|-
|align="left"| Regress or Progress '96–'97 Tour Final in Tokyo Dome || October 8, 1997 || June 21, 2001
|-
|align="left"| Mr. Children Concert Tour '99 Discovery || June 21, 2001 || June 21, 2001
|-
|align="left"| Mr. Children Concert Tour Q 2000~2001 || August 22, 2001 || August 22, 2001
|-
|align="left"| Mr. Children Concert Tour Popsaurus 2001 || January 1, 2002 || January 1, 2002
|-
|align="left"| Wonederful World on Dec 21 ||—|| March 26, 2003
|-
|align="left"| Mr. Children Tour 2004 Shifuku no Oto ||—|| December 21, 2004
|-
|align="left"| Mr. Children Dome Tour 2005 "I Love U": Final in Tokyo Dome ||—|| May 10, 2006
|-
|align="left"| Mr. Children Home Tour 2007 ||—|| November 14, 2007
|-
|align="left"| Mr. Children Home Tour 2007: In the Field ||—|| August 6, 2008
|-
|align="left"| Mr. Children: Shūmatsu no Confidence Songs ||—|| November 11, 2009
|-
|align="left"| Mr. Children Dome Tour 2009: Supermarket Fantasy ||—|| May 10, 2010
|-
|align="left"| Mr. Children: Split the Difference ||—|| November 10, 2010
|-
|align="left"| Mr.Children TOUR 2011 "SENSE" ||—|| Nov 23, 2011
|-
|align="left"| Mr.Children STADIUM TOUR 2011 SENSE -in the field- ||—|| April 18, 2012
|-
|align="left"| Mr.Children TOUR POPSAURUS 2012 ||—|| Dec 19, 2012
|-
|align="left"| Mr.Children［(an imitation) blood orange］Tour ||—|| Dec 18, 2013
|}

Commercial tie-ins
Commercial ties-ins include:

 Yazakisougyou commercials ("Kimi no Koto Igai wa Nani mo Kangaerarenai")
 Theme of Omae to Ore no Good Luck, Shōnan Bakusōzoku soundtrack ("Niji no Kanata E")
 Gurikopokkii commercials ("Replay")
 Theme of Dousoukai ("Cross Road")
 Aquaerius Ioshisu commercials ("Innocent World")
 Theme of Wakamono no Subete ("Tomorrow Never Knows")
 Theme of Pure, Airial commercials ("Na mo Naki Uta")
 Nissan Foods Buruubaado commercials ("Mata Aeru Kana")
 Theme of Koi no Bakansu ("Everything (It's you)")
 Theme of Kira Kira Hikaru ("Nishi e Higashi E")
 Theme of Naguru Onna ("Owarinaki Tabi")
 Shiseido Sea Breaze commercials ("I'll Be")
 Theme of Bus Stop ("Not Found")
 Asahi Inryo Wonda commercials ("Yasashii Uta")
 Theme of Antique ("Youthful Days")
 Theme of Koufuku no Ojii ("Drawing")
 Asahi Inryo Wonda commercials ("Sosei")
 NTT DoCoMo commercials ("Any, Hero, Kurumi, Paddle")
 Theme of Orange Days ("Sign")
 Pocari Sweat commercials ("Mirai")
 Theme of Ponkikkiizu and GachaGachaPon ("Yooidon")
 Theme of Fly, Daddy, Fly ("Running High")
 Nissin Cup Noodle no Border commercials ("And I Love You", "Bokura no Oto", "Tagatame")
 Theme of NTV's 2006 FIFA World Cup broadcasting, Toyota Tobira wo Akeyou commercials ("Houkiboshi")
 Theme of Koufuku na Shokutaku ("Kurumi")
 Theme of 14-year-old Mother ("Shirushi")
 Theme of Dororo ("Fake")
 Olympus E-416 commercials ("Irodori")
 Theme of Koizora ("Tabidachi no uta")
 Theme of NHK Beijing Olympic&Paralympic2008 ("GIFT")
 Theme of Code Blue & Code Blue 2 ("HANABI")
 Insert song of Code Blue 2 ("Koe", "Kaze to Hoshi to Moebius no wa" )
 Theme of ONE PIECE FILM STRONG WORLD ("Fanfare")
 Theme of BBC documentary, “Life -Inochi wo tsunagu monogatari-“ ("Sosei")
 CM song of Shisedo「MAQuillAGE」 ("Gift", "Esora")
 CM song of Kirin Lemon ("Youthful Days")
 CM song of Sumimoto life insurance ("Sign")
 Theme of Bokura ga ita ("Inori ~Namida no kidou")
 Theme of Bokura ga ita 2 ("Pieces")
 Opening Theme of Mezamashi TV'' ("Happy song")

References

Discographies of Japanese artists
Rock music group discographies

ja:Mr.Children#作品